is the fifth album by Yui Horie.

Track listing
"はじまりの唄" (Hajimari no Uta, A starting song)
"マッシュルームマーチ" (MASSHURUUMU MAACHI, Mushroom March)
"世界中の愛を言葉にして" (Sekai juu no ai wo kotoba ni shite, Turning the world's love into words)
"蒼い森" (Aoi Mori, Blue forest)
"Shiny merry-go-round"
"くじら光線" (Kujira Kousen, Whale light beam)
"Puzzle"
"いつか" (Itsuka, someday)
"day by day"
"スクランブル" (SUKURANBURU, Scramble)
"LET'S GO!!"
"Will"
"口笛" (Kuchibue, Whistle)

Yui Horie albums
2005 albums